Götene IF is a Swedish football club located in Götene, Västra Götaland County.

Background
Since their foundation on 24 July 1924, Götene IF has participated mainly in the lower divisions of the Swedish football league system.  Following two successive promotions in 2008 and 2009, the club played four seasons in Division 2 which is the fourth tier of Swedish football. This is also the highest level the club has reached in the Swedish league system.

Notable players
Both Stefan Rodevåg and Jesper Arvidsson started their careers in Götene IF. Stefan Rodevåg went on to become the top goalscorer of the 2006 Superettan and subsequently moving on to Örebro SK for a couple of seasons in Allsvenskan. Jesper Arvidsson was at 15 years signed by IF Elfsborg and went on to have a long career in the Swedish top tiers, representing clubs such as Djurgårdens IF and IK Sirius. 

Arne Selmosson represented the club from 1969 to 1971. At the time he acted both manager and player.

Most appearances 
Competitive matches only

Moast goals scored 
Competitive matches only

Season to season

External links
 Götene IF – Official Club Website
 Götene IF Men's Team – Football Website

Footnotes

Götene IF
Football clubs in Västra Götaland County
Association football clubs established in 1924
1924 establishments in Sweden